Acacia harveyi is a shrub belonging to the genus Acacia and the subgenus Phyllodineae. It is native to an area along the south coast in the Goldfields-Esperance and Great Southern regions of Western Australia.

See also
 List of Acacia species

References

harveyi
Acacias of Western Australia
Taxa named by George Bentham